"The Abandoning" is the second single from heavy metal band Love and Death from their debut studio album Between Here & Lost. The video was filmed on November 10, 2012 by Daniel Davison and was released on January 28, 2013.  The song ranked No. 6 on US Christian Rock chart.

Song 

The song emulates themes revolving around dedication to Christ, a confrontation with previous wrongdoings and contrition as well as a new confidence in the future.

Video 

The video begins with two people in white suits dragging two women into a room. The two people in white suits are then seen holding ropes about Brian Welch's neck with long posts while he sings. One of the women is seen on an exam table with an oxygen mask over her mouth, while the other woman is seated on a chair with her hands tied behind it with rope and her legs constrained together.  Welch is then dragged while lying on the ground.  The woman continues struggling to free herself, causing the chair to fall on its side and her being able to stand up, disabling the security camera and removing the mask from the other woman who was having convulsions.  The video screen broadcasting the contents of the security camera then explodes, impacting the two people in white suits.  The women, dressed in gowns, then run from the facility hand in hand, escaping their almost deadly fate.

Reviews 

Kevin Wierzbicki of antimusic describes the song as featuring "lots of the woozy guitar grind he helped popularize and a radio-ready vocal hook to boot"

Personnel 

 Love and Death
 Brian 'Head' Welch – vocals, rhythm guitar 
 JR Bareis - lead guitar, backing vocals
 Michael Valentine - bass guitar, backing vocals
 Dan Johnson - drums

 production personnel
 Jasen Rauch - producer
 Paul Pavao - mixer
 Ben Grosse - mixer
 Jim Monti - mixer

Chart performance

References

External links 

 Official music video

Love and Death (band) songs
2012 singles
2012 songs
Tooth & Nail Records singles
Songs written by Brian Welch